The Mindoro bulbul (Hypsipetes mindorensis) is a songbird species in the bulbul family, Pycnonotidae.

It is endemic to Mindoro in the Philippines. Its natural habitats are subtropical or tropical moist lowland forests and subtropical or tropical moist montane forests.

Taxonomy and systematics
The Mindoro bulbul was originally described in the genus Iole and has also been classified by some authorities as a separate species in the genus Ixos. Until 2010, it was considered to be a subspecies of the Philippine bulbul.

References

Mindoro bulbul
Mindoro bulbul
Birds of Mindoro
Mindoro bulbul
Mindoro bulbul